Leikvoll is a Norwegian surname. Notable people with the surname include:

Atle Leikvoll (born 1951), Norwegian diplomat
Chris Leikvoll (born 1975), Australian former professional rugby league footballer
Jan Roar Leikvoll (1974–2014), Norwegian novelist

Norwegian-language surnames